Han Yu is a Chinese writer and official of the Tang dynasty.

Han Yu may also refer to:

Han Yu (pool player), the pool player
Han Yu (curler), the curler
Ziyu of Han, the head of the House of Han during the Spring and Autumn Period